The Rotax 582 is a  two-stroke, two-cylinder, rotary intake valve, oil-in-fuel or oil injection pump, liquid-cooled, gear reduction-drive aircraft engine manufactured by BRP-Rotax GmbH & Co. KG. It is for use in non-certified aircraft operating in day visual flight rules.

Production of the engine ended at the end of 2021.

Development
The Rotax 582 is based upon the earlier Rotax 532 engine design and was designed for ultralight aircraft. The 582 increased the bore from the 532 engine's . The increased displacement had the effect of flattening out the 532's torque curve and allowed the 582 to produce useful power over a wider rpm range. Reliability over the 532 was also improved.

The 582 features liquid-cooled cylinder heads and cylinders with a rotary intake valve. Cooling is via an externally mounted radiator. Lubrication is either by use of pre-mixed fuel and oil or oil injection from an externally mounted oil tank. The 582 has dual independent breakerless, magneto capacitor discharge ignition (CDI) systems and is equipped with two piston-type carburetors. It uses a manifold-driven pneumatic fuel pump to provide fuel pressure. An optional High Altitude Compensation kit is available.

Early in the engine's production the propeller drive was via a Rotax type B gearbox, which offered gear ratios of 2.0:1, 2.238:1, and most common 2.58:1. Later in production type C or E gearboxes were offered with gear ratios of 2.62:1, 3.0:1, 3.47:1, and 4.0:1. (The type E gearbox includes an integrated electric starter motor.) The standard engine includes a wide band expansion chamber exhaust system with an extra after-muffler as optional. The standard starter is a recoil start type, with an electric starter optional. An integral alternating current generator producing 170 watts at 12 volts with external rectifier-regulator is optional. The engine includes an intake air filter and can be fitted with an optional intake silencer system.

By July 2021, more than 30,000 engines had been sold.

In July 2021, the manufacturer announced that the engine's production run will end by the end of the year, although the engine will still be sold until stocks are depleted.

Limitations
The manufacturer acknowledges the design limitations of this engine, warning pilots:

Applications

Specifications (Rotax 582)

See also
Rotax aircraft engines
Arrow 500
Hirth 3202

References

External links

Company website

Two-stroke aircraft piston engines
Rotax engines